The Kaohsiung Lighthouse, also called Cihou Lighthouse or Cijin Lighthouse, is a lighthouse in Cijin District, Kaohsiung, Taiwan.

History

After the signing of Convention of Peking in 1860 during the Qing Dynasty rule, the Takau Harbor was opened to foreign traders in 1863. With increasing commercial shipping activities and a lack of a proper ship navigation system, the British engineers built a Chinese-style rectangular red-brick lighthouse at the top of Mount Ki-au (旗後山), at the southern side of the harbor.

During the Japanese rule, in line with the expansion of the harbor, the lighthouse was rebuilt in 1916 as part of the project. It underwent renovation in 1918 to what it looks like today. The base of the lighthouse building was rebuilt in Baroque style.

In 1985, the lighthouse was designated a Historical Building and subsequently opened to the public.

Features
The lighthouse tower provides an excellent view of the entire Port of Kaohsiung.

See also

 List of tourist attractions in Taiwan
 List of lighthouses in Taiwan

References

External links

 Maritime and Port Bureau MOTC
旗后燈塔 'Cihou Lighthouse' 

1916 establishments in Taiwan
Lighthouses in Taiwan
Lighthouses completed in 1916
Buildings and structures in Kaohsiung